Christopher Chandler or Chris Chandler may refer to:

 Christopher Chandler (businessman), New Zealand businessman
 Christopher Chandler (politician), lawyer and politician
 Christopher N. Chandler, former journalist and political activist
 Chris Chandler (American football), former football player who played as a quarterback in the National Football League

See also
 Chandler (disambiguation)